Lapedona is a comune (municipality) in the Province of Fermo in the Italian region Marche, located about  southeast of Ancona and about  northeast of Ascoli Piceno.

Lapedona borders the following municipalities: Altidona, Campofilone, Fermo, Montefiore dell'Aso, Monterubbiano, Moresco.

Demographic evolution

People related to Lapedona 
 Savino Marè (1964- ), actor, writer and photographer.

References

External links
 www.asonetcultura.it/lapedona/index.asp

Cities and towns in the Marche